Remarque is a crater on Mercury.  Its name was adopted by the International Astronomical Union (IAU) on December 16, 2013. Remarque is named for the German author Erich Maria Remarque.

Remarque has a region of permanent shadow on much of its floor, which has a bright radar signature.  This is interpreted to represent a deposit of water ice.

Remarque is on the Borealis Planitia and is located northeast of the ghost crater Aristoxenus.

References

Impact craters on Mercury